Ooga Booga is an online multiplayer video game for the Dreamcast, focusing on the combat of "Kahunas" using thrown shrunken heads, riding animals, staffs, or using spells. The game received positive reviews from video game critics.

Gameplay 

The storyline is that Ooga Booga is a volcano goddess that creates islands, and has leaders of tribes, the Kahunas, that battle for her favour. It has a distinct Polynesian style and tone, and has many multiplayer islands and characters which can be unlocked. It was one of the last online games for the Dreamcast. There are four basic Kahunas that the player can use: Hottie (balanced), Fatty (strong), Twitchy (fast), and Hoodoo (spells). There are other unlockable Kahunas based on the main four. Some of them include Death (a floating skeleton), Abe (former U.S. President Abraham Lincoln), Superguy (superhero), Joseph (a caveman who says "ooga booga") and Dwarf (a dwarf).

Development and release 

Ooga Booga was developed by Visual Concepts and published by Sega. The game started out as a real time strategy game about a horsman converting villager tribes to your side through magic spells, It was later made into a arena fighter instead. The game was first announced during "Sega Gamer's Day 2000". It previously had the tentative title of "Resurrection". The game was showcased at Sega's E3 2001. The title included copy protection.

On January 26, 2018, the game became available to play online once again.

Reception 

Ooga Booga received "favorable" reviews according to the review aggregation website Metacritic. The Los Angeles Times compared the game to Ico for the PlayStation 2. Gary Whitta of NextGen called it "A tasty slice of lightweight party fun that proves there's life in Dreamcast yet."

References

External links 
 

2001 video games
Action video games
Dreamcast games
Dreamcast-only games
Multiplayer and single-player video games
Multiplayer online games
North America-exclusive video games
Sega video games
Video games about magic
Video games developed in the United States
Video games set on fictional islands